South Venice is a census-designated place (CDP) in Sarasota County, Florida, United States. The population was 13,949 at the 2010 census. It is part of the Bradenton–Sarasota–Venice Metropolitan Statistical Area.

Geography

South Venice is west of North Port, south of Venice, and north of Englewood. In 2014, a land partnership with Mattamy Homes was created to develop the West Villages, a large community of subdivisions.

Demographics

As of the census of 2000, there were 13,539 people, 5,823 households, and 4,081 families residing in the CDP. The racial makeup of the CDP was 97.67% White, 0.40% African American, 0.26% Native American, 0.50% Asian, 0.01% Pacific Islander, 0.36% from other races, and 0.80% from two or more races. Hispanic or Latino of any race were 1.74% of the population.

There were 5,823 households, out of which 23.9% had children under the age of 18 living with them, 57.5% were married couples living together, 9.5% had a female householder with no husband present, and 29.9% were non-families. 22.7% of all households were made up of individuals, and 11.9% had someone living alone who was 65 years of age or older.  The average household size was 2.33 and the average family size was 2.69.

In the CDP, the population was spread out, with 19.5% under the age of 18, 5.1% from 18 to 24, 25.3% from 25 to 44, 25.1% from 45 to 64, and 25.0% who were 65 years of age or older.  The median age was 45 years. For every 100 females, there were 93.6 males.  For every 100 females age 18 and over, there were 90.9 males.

The median income for a household in the CDP was $36,590, and the median income for a family was $40,830. Males had a median income of $29,287 versus $23,466 for females. The per capita income for the CDP was $18,787.  About 3.0% of families and 5.7% of the population were below the poverty line, including 5.7% of those under age 18 and 4.8% of those age 65 or over.

References

External links
 South Venice Civic Association

Census-designated places in Sarasota County, Florida
Beaches of Sarasota County, Florida
Sarasota metropolitan area
Census-designated places in Florida
Populated places on the Intracoastal Waterway in Florida
Beaches of Florida